Hamarøyskaftet is a mountain in Hamarøy Municipality in Nordland county, Norway. The  mountain is a characteristic landmark of the region. The mountain was first ascended by Martin Hoff Ekroll in 1885.

The normal route to the peak is described as technically easy, with some exposed parts.

In 1998, Hamarøyskaftet was featured on a Norwegian postage stamp (NK 1333 with a value of ).

References

Mountains of Nordland
Hamarøy